All the Devil's Men is a 2018 British action thriller film written and directed by Matthew Hope and starring Milo Gibson, Sylvia Hoeks, Gbenga Akinnagbe and William Fichtner.

Plot
Jack Collins is a war-junkie and former Navy SEAL turned bounty hunter who tracks down terrorists as part of the CIA's outsourcing to private companies. Battling personal demons, the powers that be think he is becoming a liability so his CIA handler Leigh offers him one last chance to keep fighting, sending him to London for a job. There, he finds himself part of a three-man team tasked with hunting down a disavowed CIA Operative called McKnight before he procures a WMD from Russian gangsters and disappears. Together, Collins, Brennan and Samuelson find themselves locked in urban tactical combat with a former colleague, Deighton, and his private army, hired by McKnight as protection. Both sides fight smart and as casualties and betrayal mounts on both sides, Collins refuses to be defeated as he battles his way to an explosive climax.

Cast
 Milo Gibson as Jack Collins
 Sylvia Hoeks as Leigh Allen
 Gbenga Akinnagbe as Pete Samuelson
 William Fichtner as Mike Brennan
 Joseph Millson as Tony Deighton
 Elliot Cowan as Terry McKnight
 Perry Fitzpatrick as Jimmy Logan
 Yavor Baharov as Chief Oleg Velibor
 Rinat Khismatouline as Mark Ivan

Release
The film was released theatrically in the United States on December 7, 2018.  It was released on Blu-Ray, DVD and digital platforms in the U.S. on February 5, 2019.

Reception
The film has  rating on Rotten Tomatoes.  Barbara Shulgasser-Parker of Common Sense Media awarded the film two stars out of five.

Dennis Harvey of Variety gave the film a negative review and wrote, "There’s a lot of double- and triple-crossing, culminating in a fadeout that seems to go one plot twist over the line of narrative coherency."

Frank Scheck of The Hollywood Reporter also gave the film a negative review and wrote, "The problem is that the pic is such an utterly routine, formulaic and forgettable example of its genre that watching it becomes an exercise in endurance."

References

External links
 
 

British action thriller films
2018 action thriller films
Saban Films films
2010s English-language films
2010s Russian-language films
2010s British films